The International Journal of Selection and Assessment is a quarterly peer-reviewed scientific journal covering personnel and managerial psychology. It was established in 1993 and is published by John Wiley & Sons. The editor-in-chief is Ioannis Nikolaou (Athens University of Economics and Business). According to the Journal Citation Reports, the journal has a 2020 impact factor of 1.840, ranking it 62nd out of 83 journals in the category "Psychology, Applied" and 191st out of 226 journals in the category "Management".

References

External links

Quarterly journals
Personnel psychology journals
Publications established in 1993
Wiley (publisher) academic journals
English-language journals